Juan Francisco Aranda Rodríguez (born 24 July 1988) is a Spanish footballer who plays for UD Fuente de Cantos as a right back.

Club career
Born in Montemolín, Badajoz, Extremadura, Aranda graduated from Recreativo de Huelva's youth setup. He made his senior debuts with the reserves, playing several seasons in the Tercera División.

On 19 June 2010 Aranda played his first match as a professional, starting in a 0–4 away loss against Rayo Vallecano in the Segunda División. He subsequently appeared in two further matches in the 2010–11 campaign, and was released in May 2011.

On 21 June 2011 Aranda joined CD San Roque de Lepe in the Segunda División B. On 30 January of the following year he moved to fellow league team Cádiz CF, but appeared rarely for the latter during his six-month spell.

In the 2012 summer Aranda signed for UD Melilla also in the third level. He subsequently resumed his career in the lower leagues, representing EF Emérita Augusta and UD Fuente de Cantos.

References

External links
 
  
 

1988 births
Living people
People from Tentudía
Sportspeople from the Province of Badajoz
Spanish footballers
Footballers from Extremadura
Association football defenders
Segunda División B players
Segunda División players
Tercera División players
Atlético Onubense players
Recreativo de Huelva players
CD San Roque de Lepe footballers
Cádiz CF players
UD Melilla footballers